Hay List (24 August 2005 – 3 February 2015) was a thoroughbred racehorse trained and bred in Australia. He won Manikato Stakes and All Aged Stakes, two Group one races. He was known as one of the major rivals of undefeated mare Black Caviar. Hay List  won the 1 million-dollar Newmarket Handicap in a close finish on 10 March 2012. Hay List won the race carrying 58 and a half kilograms, a feat not accomplished for over 60 years.

Against all odds Hay List returned to racing after suffering from a fractured knee following a colic surgery in 2012. He was later retired in October 2013 due to long standing issues with his hind foot and the development of a respiratory noise while galloping.

In January 2014 Hay List again defied the medical text books by making a full recovery from a second colic surgery during which his entire caecum had to be removed.

Hay List was euthanised on 3 February 2015 after suffering from laminitis. He was 9 years old.

Pedigree

References

External links
Racing stats at racingsports.com.au

2005 racehorse births
Racehorses bred in Australia
Racehorses trained in Australia
Thoroughbred family 8-j
2015 racehorse deaths